was a Japanese board game designer, novelist, and manga writer. He was known for his alternate history novels Seito and Red Sun Black Cross, among others. He wrote the story for his manga Imperial Guards (with illustrator Yū Itō) and Highschool of the Dead (with illustrator Shōji Satō). Imperial Guards was nominated for the Tezuka Osamu Cultural Prize in 2007 and for the first Manga Taishō in 2008. He died on March 22, 2017 from ischaemic heart disease.

Bibliography

Manga 
  by Daisuke Tō (another name of Satō), Yoshifumi Kobayashi and others
 Imperial Guards by Daisuke Satō and Yū Itō
  by Daisuke Satō and Shōji Satō

Games

Novels 
 
 
 
 Red Sun Black Cross

Others 
He made a five-minute promo for the 1-hour special episode of the anime One Piece titled "Luffy vs Sanji", which was aired on October 1, 2017.

References

External links 
 

1964 births
2017 deaths
20th-century Japanese novelists
21st-century Japanese novelists
Japanese nationalists
Japanese science fiction writers
Komazawa University alumni
Manga artists from Ishikawa Prefecture
Manga writers
Writers from Ishikawa Prefecture